Maurice Samuels (born August 9, 1968) is the Betty Jane Anlyan Professor of French at Yale University. He graduated with a BA (summa cum laude) in 1990 from Harvard University, where he also earned his MA (1995) and PhD (2000). Before moving to Yale in 2006, Samuels taught at the University of Pennsylvania. He specializes in the literature and culture of nineteenth-century France and in Jewish Studies, and is the author of books and articles on these and other topics. He is the inaugural director of the Yale Program for the Study of Antisemitism.

Work
Samuels is the author of T he Spectacular Past: Popular History and the Novel in Nineteenth-Century France (2004), Inventing the Israelite: Jewish Fiction in Nineteenth-Century France (2010), and The Right to Difference: French Universalism and the Jews (2016). He co-edited and did translations for Nineteenth-Century Jewish Literature Reader (2013). His new book, The Betrayal of the Duchess: The Scandal That Unmade the Bourbon Monarchy and Made France Modern, will be published by Basic Books in spring 2020.

In 2011, Samuels became the inaugural director of the Yale Program for the Study of Antisemitism (YPSA), housed at Yale's Whitney Humanities Center. Through a seminar series of invited international scholars, an annual conference, and the awarding of faculty and student research grants, YPSA "promotes the study of the perception of Jews, both positive and negative, in various societies and historical moments, and also encourages comparisons with other forms of discrimination and racism."

Awards
The Spectacular Past won the Gaddis Smith International Book Prize, awarded by Yale University's MacMillan Center. Inventing the Israelite and The Right to Difference both received the Aldo and Jeanne Scaglione Prize for French and Francophone Studies, given by the Modern Language Association. In 2015, Samuels was awarded a fellowship from the John Simon Guggenheim Memorial Foundation.

Teaching
Samuels teaches undergraduate and graduate courses on a variety of topics. Recent courses include "Paris: Capital of the Nineteenth Century"; "Money and the Novel"; "Jewish Identity and French Culture"; "Realism and Naturalism"; "Fin-de-siècle France"; and "Representing the Holocaust." With Alice Kaplan, he teaches a popular undergraduate survey course, The Modern French Novel.

References

External links
Yale Faculty Homepage
Yale Program for the Study of Antisemitism
Maurice Samuels Discussing "Inventing the Israelite"
Recording of Samuels' 2015 Helen Diller Family Endowment Distinguished Lecture in Jewish Studies at UC Santa Cruz, "French Universalism and the Jews: Anti-Antisemitism and the Right to Difference," May 18, 2015
Connecticut Jewish Ledger - Q & A with Prof. Maurice Samuels, head of Yale's new antisemitism program (Nov 16, 2011)

Yale University faculty
Living people
21st-century American historians
21st-century American male writers
Harvard University alumni
University of Pennsylvania faculty
1968 births
American male non-fiction writers